Edvard Alexander Westermarck (Helsinki, 20 November 1862 – Tenala, 3 September 1939) was a Finnish philosopher and sociologist. Among other subjects, he studied exogamy and the incest taboo.

Biography
Westermarck was born in 1862 in a well-off Lutheran family, part of the Swedish-speaking population of Finland. His father worked at the University of Helsinki as a bursar, and his maternal grandfather was a professor at the same university. It was thus natural for Edvard to study there, obtaining his first degree in philosophy in 1886, but developing also an interest in anthropology and reading the works of Charles Darwin. His thesis, The History of Human Marriage, was published as a book in 1891, and would be published again in a substantially revised edition in 1921.

In 1892, Westermarck became a lecturer in Sociology at the University of Helsinki. While at the university, he became the chairman of the Prometheus Society, a student society promoting religious freedom. He was promoted to professor of Moral Philosophy in 1906 and occupied that chair until 1918, when he moved to the Åbo Akademi University in Turku.

While still teaching Philosophy in Turku, he helped found academic sociology in the United Kingdom, becoming the first Martin White Professor of Sociology (with Leonard Trelawny Hobhouse) in 1907 in the University of London. One of the original reasons he spent time in London is he did not feel safe in Helsinki or Turku because of his advocacy of the independence of Finland, but even when the political situation quieted down, he continued teaching in both London and Turku until 1930 and 1932 respectively. He had also served for some years, between 1918 and 1921, as Rector of the Åbo Akademi University. He retired in 1932, and spent the rest of his life completing and publishing his major works, Ethical Relativity (1932), Three Essays on Sex and Morals (1934), The Future of Marriage in Western Civilization (1936) and Christianity and Morals (1939), the latter published in the year when he died. In 1929, he had published the English version, Memories of My Life of his autobiography, originally published in Swedish in 1927.

Views
He has been described as "first Darwinian sociologist" or "the first sociobiologist", as well as “an authority in the history of morals and of marriage customs.” He denied the then prevailing view that early human beings lived in sexual promiscuity, arguing that in fact historically monogamy preceded polygamy. He maintained that “Marriage is rooted in the family rather than the family in the marriage”.

The phenomenon of reverse sexual imprinting is when two people live in close domestic proximity during the first few years in the life of either one, and both become desensitised to sexual attraction, now known as the Westermarck effect, was first formally described by him in his thesis The History of Human Marriage (1891).

Westermarck was also a scholar of Morocco and offered a positivist view of how its folk religion was formed in his two-volume work Ritual and Belief in Morocco (1926). He had started his fieldwork in Morocco as early as 1898, and visited the country 21 times in the next thirty years, spending in total seven years in the country. He also studied his favorite subject, marriage, there, publishing in 1914 Marriage Ceremonies of Morocco.

Westermarck critiqued Christian institutions and Christian ideas on the grounds that they lacked foundation. He was also a moral relativist and in his two-volume The Origin and Development of Moral Ideas (1906–1908) he argued that moral judgements are not rational but are based on emotions and on social approval or disapproval. As a consequence, he also denied the existence of general or universal moral truth.

In the UK, his name is often spelled Edward. His sister, Helena Westermarck, was a writer and artist.

Books 
1891: The History of Human Marriage. 3 Vol, Macmillan, London.
1906: The Origin and Development of the Moral Ideas. 2 Vol, MacMillan, London
1907: Siveys ja kristinusko: Esitelmä. Ylioppilasyhdistys Prometheus, Helsinki.
1914: Marriage Ceremonies in Morocco. Macmillan, London.
1919: Tapojen historiaa: Kuusi akadeemista esitelmää: Pitänyt Turussa syksyllä 1911 Edward Westermarck. 2nd edition. Suomalaisen kirjallisuuden seura, Helsinki.
1920: Religion och magi (Religion and magick), Studentföreningen Verdandis Småskrifter 149, Albert Bonniers Förlag, Stockholm
1926: Ritual and Belief in Morocco. 2 Vol.
1926: A short History of Human Marriage. Macmillan, London.
1930: Wit and Wisdom in Morocco. Routledge, London.
1932: Ethical Relativity.
1932: Avioliiton historia. WSOY, Helsinki.
1932: Early Beliefs and Their Social Influence. London: Macmillan.
1933: Pagan Survivals in Mohammedan Civilisation. London: Macmillan. 
1933: Moraalin synty ja kehitys. WSOY, Helsinki.
1934: Three Essays on Sex and Marriage. Macmillan, London.
1934: Freuds teori on Oedipuskomplexen i sociologisk belysning. Vetenskap och bildning, 45. Bonnier, Stockholm.
1936: The future of Marriage in Western Civilisation. Macmillan, London.
1937: "Forward" in The Wandering Spirit: A Study of Human Migration. Macmillan, London
1939: Kristinusko ja moraali (Christianity and Morals). Otava, Helsinki.

References

Further reading
 Juhani Ihanus: Multiple origins: Edward Westermarck in search of mankind. Frankfurt am Main [u.a.]: Lang, 1999 (Europäische Studien zur Ideen- und Wissenschaftsgeschichte; 6); 
 
 Pipatti, Otto (2019). Morality Made Visible: Edward Westermarck's Moral and Social Theory. London: Routledge
 Kirsti Suolinna, Catherine af Hällström & Tommy Lahtinen: Portraying Morocco: Edward Westermarck's fieldwork and photographs 1898–1913. Åbo: Akademis Förl, 2000;

External links
 
 
 Westermarck, Edward (1862-1939), BEROSE International Encyclopaedia of the Histories of Anthropology
The Westermarck Society
Edvard Westermarck in 375 humanists 21.03.2015, Faculty of Arts, University of Helsinki
http://375humanistia.helsinki.fi/en/edvard-westermarck/critic-of-religion-and-believer-in-radical-tolerance

1862 births
1939 deaths
Academic staff of the University of Helsinki
Swedish-speaking Finns
Finnish sociologists
Finnish anthropologists
Social anthropologists
Cultural anthropologists
Sociologists of religion
Anthropologists of religion
Finnish sexologists
Finnish agnostics
20th-century Finnish philosophers
Incest
Academics of the London School of Economics
19th-century Finnish philosophers
Academic staff of Åbo Akademi University